Jürgen Grasmück (Born 23. January 1940 in Hanau, Hessen ; Died 7. August 2007  in Altenstadt ) was a German author of horror fiction and science fiction novels.

He wrote under the pseudonyms Albert C. Bowles, Bert Floorman, YES Garett, JA Gorman, Jay Grams, Jürgen Grasse, YES Grouft, Jeff Hammon, Ron Kelly, Rolf Murat, Steve D. rock, Dan Shocker, Owen L. Todd and Henri Vadim.

He is best known for the series of horror fiction stories "Macabros" and "Larry Brent," which he wrote under the pen name Dan Shocker. An episode of the radio adaption of his 'Larry Brent' stories (Episode 9, Snakeheads of Dr. Gorgo) was banned by German censors in 1984.

 Larry Brent
 001: Horror Creeps through Bonnard's House (1968, Magic Circle) 
 002: Fear Awakens in the Castle of Death (1968, Magic Circle) 
 003: In the Gallery of Horrors (1968, Magic Circle) 
 004: The Demon with the Deadly Eyes (1969, Magic Circle)

References

German horror writers
German male writers
1940 births
2007 deaths